Louisa Freear (26 November 1871–23 March 1939) was an English actress and comedienne.

She was born in Lambeth, London, and was part of the Freear theatrical family; her parents were actor Henry Butler Freear and Mary Jane Freear ( Burke), a vocalist. Her brother Walter Freear was an actor, dancer and comedian, and brother Alfred worked as a musician.

Described as "vital and diminutive", she performed the role Flo Honeydew in The Lady Slavey (1894) and Puck in Herbert Beerbohm Tree's lavish 1900 production of A Midsummer Night's Dream.  She was also a success in George Dance's comic opera, A Chinese Honeymoon, in 1901.

In 1912, she married Charles Shepherd.  She died in London in 1939.

References

External links

 Images at National Portrait Gallery
  Louie Freear in Press and Literature

1939 deaths
1871 births